The House of Shishman, also Shishmanids or Shishmanovtsi, was a medieval Bulgarian royal dynasty of Cuman (or partial Cuman) origin.

The Shishman dynasty consecutively ruled the Second Bulgarian Empire for approximately one century, from 1323 to 1422, until it was conquered by the Ottomans. The Shishmanids were related to the earlier Asen dynasty, and according to the Ragusan historian Lukarić, also to the immediately preceding Terter dynasty. In Plamen Pavlov's view, the Shishman dynasty's founder, despot Shishman of Vidin, may have been the brother of George I, the first Bulgarian Terterid ruler, thus also coming to Bulgaria from the Kingdom of Hungary after 1241.

Members
Among its more notable members were:

Main branch:
 despot Shishman of Vidin
Michael Shishman of Bulgaria (Michael Asen III) (b. after 1280, ruled 1323–1330)
Ivan Stephen of Bulgaria (ruled 1330–1331)
despot Belaur of Vidin (d. 1336)

Sratsimir branch:
Ivan Alexander of Bulgaria (nephew of Michael Shishman) (ruled 1331–1371)
co-emperor Michael Asen IV of Bulgaria (b. c. 1322, co-emperor 1332–1355)
Ivan Sratsimir of Bulgaria (b. 1324/1325, ruled 1356–1397 in Vidin)
Queen Dorothea of Bosnia
Constantine II of Bulgaria (b. early 1370s, ruled 1397–1422 in Vidin and in exile)
Ivan Shishman of Bulgaria (b. 1350/1351, ruled 1371–1395 in Tarnovo)
Patriarch Joseph II of Constantinople? (possible illegitimate son) (Patriarch of Constantinople 1416–1439)
Fruzhin (d. c. 1460)

List of monarchs

Principality/Tsardom of Vidin

Principality of Karvuna

Tsardom of Tarnovo

Principality of Valona

Principality of Serres

Notes

Citations

Sources

References

External links
 

 
Bulgarian royal houses
People of Cuman descent